The EuroLeague Rising Star in an annual award of the EuroLeague, which is the top-tier level European-wide professional club basketball league, that is given to the player the EuroLeague deems its "top rising star". The award began in the 2004–05 season, and the winner is selected by the EuroLeague's head coaches.

Only players who were younger than age 22, on July 1 of the summer before the season started, are eligible for the award.

Winners

Notes:
 There was no awarding in the 2019–20, because the season was cancelled due to the coronavirus pandemic in Europe.

Honours

Players

Player nationality

Teams

Notes

References

External links
 EuroLeague Official Web Page
 InterBasket EuroLeague Basketball Forum
 TalkBasket EuroLeague Basketball Forum
 

Rising Star